Davorin Stetner (born 10 November 1981), Croatian entrepreneur and investor, president of the Croatian Automobile & Karting Federation - a national auto sport authority that is member of Fédération Internationale de l'Automobile. He also served as an advisor to the Croatian president Kolinda Grabar-Kitarovic in her Economic Council from 2015 to 2020.

Stetner made a world breakthrough with acquisition of Formula 1 media rights for Croatia in 2011. when he negotiated and signed a contract with Bernie Ecclestone beating huge multinational companies. At 29 years old then, he thus became the world's youngest private F1 rights holder. As he later said – Formula 1 and the contacts and friendships he made there were his true breakthrough and lifetime value.

Investor career and business angel 
In 2011 Stetner joined Croatian Business Angels Network - CRANE where he started to invest in startup companies. He first became a board member and then in 2015. President of this well-known union of investors in Croatia. He is maintaining his third mandate at the helm of CRANE. In 2018. he became a board member of the European Business Angels Network - EBAN and in 2020. was re-elected on this position. EBAN is one of the major Business Angels and investors unions in the World and it is headquartered in Brussels. Stetner invested in many startup companies and is actively mentoring and helping young Entrepreneurs worldwide.

In 2019. he started investment in Eco farm located in the almost abandoned village of Tihocaj in the Zumberak Nature Park where he bought about 250.000 square meters of land and old stone houses. Currently, there is Wagyu beef production. Stetner hosted many guests at his property including U.S. ambassador W. Robert Kohorst, Israeli ambassador Ilan Mor and the location was a place of a farewell party for UK ambassador Andrew Dalgleish. The main topics Stetner is addressing at his property are climate changes and deforestation which affect our planet.

Office of the President of Croatia 2015–2020 

In 2015, President of Croatia Kolinda Grabar-Kitarovic appointed him to the Presidential Economic Council - her main advisory council for economy affairs. Stetner was there for five years until early 2020. when president Grabar-Kitarović went off duty. During the time at the office he was loud and active in fighting for the Entrepreneurs and creating a positive environment for foreign and domestic investors. His main focus was on promoting young entrepreneurs and startups and setting better mentality toward those who are entering business. Stetner was personal envoy to the President on many national and international occasions and events.

Fédération Internationale de l'Automobile and Croatian Automobile Federation 
 Since his start as a delegate representing Croatia in the Fédération Internationale de l'Automobile in 2019. Stetner was appointed to the FIA ASN Development Task Force which is one of the most important FIA bodies managing and helping national federations (ASN's) to develop.

Since 2020. Stetner was a member of the FIA Digital Motor Sport working group which created all preparations for the digital sport to be recognized as motorsport discipline. FIA Digital Motor Sport Working group was decommissioned at the end of 2020. when the new FIA eSports Commission (Formerly FIA Digital Motor Sport Commission) was introduced with Stetner as a member.

He is also representing Croatia in the FIA Central European Zone which consists of 16 countries. From September 2022 he is member of the General Assembly of the Croatian Olympic Committee.

GP1 
Stetner is the founder and owner of the Central European Sports TV channel GP1 (TV channel). GP1 first started in 2011. under the name Kreator F1 and Kreator F1 HD for broadcasting only Formula 1 in the biggest Croatian provider Max TV - part of Croatian Telecom as Stetner acquired exclusive Formula 1 media rights for Croatia.  Kreator F1 was renamed Kreator TV in 2013. In the following years GP1 acquired MotoGP, Volvo Ocean Race and other media rights and started investing in own broadcast facilities in Jastrebarsko, Croatia. Today GP1 is present in all major IPTV & cable operators in Croatia, Bosnia & Herzegovina and from April 2021. in Slovenia with the program on Slovenian language along with the motorsport and F1 news portals in Central-Eastern Europe. GP1 made a long-term deals with NASCAR Whelen Euro Series and some other European racing series like ESET Cup Series and it is producing live broadcasts from some of the most famous racing tracks like Hungaroring, Brands Hatch, Valencia, Slovakia Ring, Automotodrom Brno and others. Stetner is still at the helm as company's CEO.

Notable duties 
He is a member of the Innovation Council appointed by the Croatian Minister of Economy in 2018. Stetner has significant experience in diplomacy and working with Governments and was a member of many high-level conferences like Global Entrepreneurship Summit, Dubrovnik Forum, Wilton Park and others. He is working with international institutions and diplomatic representatives on a daily basis. He was a speaker at many conferences and events.

Stetner was official participant of "The future of the UK’s bilateral relationships in Europe" conference organized by Wilton Park - an executive agency of the UK Foreign and Commonwealth Office in 2018. High-level conference was held in Wiston House castle, West Sussex and gathered European leading representatives from the worlds of politics, business, academia, diplomacy, civil society and media along with the British government with the main focus on UK and Europe relations after Brexit. Stetner is also a long term jury member of the "Golden Key" Awards for the best Croatian exporter by the Union of the Croatian Exporters and "Zlatna Kuna" - awards for the best Croatian companies by the Croatian Chamber of Commerce.

Travels and Expeditions 
Stetner was part of many expeditions to remote parts of the World. He traveled to more than 80 Countries of the World and 6 continents. From filming documentaries in Ivory Coast after Rebellion War, visiting Pygmy tribes in the jungles of Gabon and Cameroon, exploring Darien province in the Amazons to living with Touaregs in heart of Sahara. Most of his dangerous trips were in his twenties and mid thirties. He wrote many articles and travelogues for Croatian media.

Honors 
Award of the Varazdin County for the outstanding contribution, Croatia, September/2022

The World Bank’s recognition for the digitalization of the company’s founding process in Croatia 

Award of the Zagreb Automobile Federation for the outstanding contribution, December/2019

Special Award "Break the mould" of the European Business Angels Network - EBAN, November/2016

References

Living people
Croatian sports executives and administrators
1981 births